Problem child may refer to a child who is particularly difficult to raise or educate, especially due to disruptive or antisocial behavior.

Problem child may also refer to:

Film, television and theatre
 Problem Child (film), a 1990 comedy film directed by Dennis Dugan, with two sequels and a derivative TV series
 Problem Child (TV series), an animated series based on the films
 Problem Child, a 1997 Canadian drama, from the six-play cycle Suburban Motel, written by George F. Walker
 "Problem Child", an Instant Star episode
 "Problem Child", an Umineko no Naku Koro ni episode

Music
 Problem Child, a 1980s band featuring Louis Prima Jr.

Songs
      "Problem Child" (The Damned song)
  "Problem Child" (The Beach Boys song), a 1990 single
  "Problem Child", a song from the 1976 AC/DC album, Dirty Deeds Done Dirt Cheap
  "Problem Child", a song by Glue Gun from The Scene Is Not for Sale
  "Problem Child", a song by Roy Orbison from Roy Orbison at the Rock House
   "Problem Child", a song by Doyle Bramhall II & Smokestack from Welcome
"Problem Child", a song by pop-punk band Simple Plan from Taking One for the Team
   "Problem child", a song by Graham Parker and The Rumour

Other uses
 Problem child (growth–share matrix), an embryonic, start-up fund dependant, commercial endeavour archetype
 The Problem Child, a 2006 Sisters Grimm novel by Michael Buckley
 Problem Child, a boat that set a speed record
 LSD: Mein Sorgenkind (LSD: My Problem Child), a book by Albert Hofmann